HFE2 can refer to:
 Hemojuvelin
 HAMP